Sigbjørn Bernhoft Osa (3 May 1910 2 February 1990) was a Norwegian fiddler and traditional folk musician. He was one of the best known Norwegian performers of folk music in the 1900s.

Personal life
Osa was born in Ulvik, Hardanger as the son of fiddler and painter Lars Osa and children's writer Hermine Bernhoft-Osa. He spent his first years in Valle, Setesdal, and moved to Voss when he was six years old. He was married to Kersti Alice Grambo from 1937, and to Anne Heggtveit from 1950. He was the father of actress Liv Bernhoft Osa (b. 1957). He died in Voss in 1990.

Career
Osa's father was a skilled violin and Hardingfele player, and the boy started to play both instruments. He studied violin with Bjarne Brustad in Oslo, then in Bergen with the academy of Musikselskabet Harmoniens orkester from 1929 to 1930, and in Berlin from 1931 to 1932.

He made his début as violinist in 1937. He started playing for the radio (Norwegian Broadcasting Corporation) in the 1940s, and recorded more than 350 traditional airs, either on hardingfele or violin, between 1948 and 1978. His airs were often based on the Voss tradition, from elder fiddlers such as Sjur Helgeland, Ola Mosafinn or his own father. He often toured in Norway, Europe and the United States, with concerts or causeries.

He composed a concert for hardingfele, Three fjords, in cooperation with Geirr Tveitt. In the 1970s he cooperated with the rock group "Saft". He published the textbook Hardingfela in 1952.

He became Horary Citizen of the U.S. state of Washington in 1968. He received the Arts Council Norway Honorary Award in 1976.  He also received the Spellemannprisen Honorary Prize.

Selected works
Hardingfela (1952) textbook
Spelmannsliv (1979) autobiography (with Jostein Mæland)

References

1910 births
1990 deaths
People from Ulvik
Norwegian fiddlers
Male violinists
Spellemannprisen winners
20th-century violinists
20th-century Norwegian male musicians